KTNY (101.7 FM) is a radio station licensed to serve Libby, Montana.  The station is owned by Lincoln County Broadcasters. It airs a soft oldies music format.

KTNY and KLCB share studios at 251 W Cedar St. in Libby. They also share a transmitter site south of town on Spencer Road. KTNY is Lincoln County's most powerful station.

The station was assigned the KTNY call letters by the Federal Communications Commission on January 16, 1985. The call sign refers to the Canadian spelling of name of the Native American tribe of the area, and the name of the river that passes through the Kootenai valley, and the name of the National Forest in which it is located; KooTeNaY. On air date April 6, 1986.

References

External links
KTNY website

TNY
Soft adult contemporary radio stations in the United States
Lincoln County, Montana
Radio stations established in 1985
1985 establishments in Montana